BURT bindings are classified as plate-style snow ski bindings invented in the 1970s by Burton A. Weinstein. Their unique feature entailed two retractable cables for each ski that would extend and retract instead of completely releasing the ski from the foot in the event of a fall.  

The "Burt Retractable" binding was a very complex invention, and an important part of the development of modern carving ski technology.  It was the first and only binding which did not flatten the middle of the ski, which in turn would enable easier turning.

The carving ski-technology was co-created by Georges Joubert in France. In 1975, Joachim Schelb (a student of Georges Joubert) used this binding with a Kneissl ski named "Jeans" which was the first carving ski model.  On this ski, fitted with the Burt binding in 1975, Joachim. Schelb carved for the first time at Sommand-Praz-de-Lys in France. He was very successful in using this binding.

The "Burt Retractable" did not sell for long as the injury rate of having the ski pop back on during a fall broke many bones with the dreaded "spiral fracture" being the most common. Probably the worst binding ever made from a safety standpoint. Lange quickly ceased production in Broomfield, Co.

References

Ski equipment manufacturers